Primula is a genus of 400–500 species of low-growing herbs in the family Primulaceae.

Primula may refer to:

 970 Primula, a main belt asteroid
 Autobianchi Primula, a small car
 , a Tripartite-class minehunter
 Primula (food), the trade name of a cheese-based spread
 Primula (Shuffle!), a Shuffle! character
 , more than one ship of the British Royal Navy